Portland Symphony may refer to:

Portland Symphony Orchestra, Portland, Maine, United States
Oregon Symphony, Portland, Oregon, United States, formerly the Portland Symphony Orchestra (to 1967)
Portland Columbia Symphony, Portland, Oregon
Portland Youth Philharmonic, Portland, Oregon, formerly the Portland Junior Symphony